Al Woods may refer to:
Sir Albert Woods (1816–1904), English officer of arms
Albert H. Woods (1870–1951), American theatrical producer
Alvis Woods (born 1953), American baseball player
Al Woods (American football) (born 1987), American football player

See also
Alan Woods (disambiguation)
Alex Woods (disambiguation)
Al Wood (born 1958), American basketball player